Basilodes chrysopis is a species of moth in the owlet moth family Noctuidae. It was first described by Augustus Radcliffe Grote in 1881 and is found in North America.

References

Further reading

External links
 

Amphipyrinae
Articles created by Qbugbot
Moths described in 1881